Alboreá is a singing style whose name comes from “alboradas” singing which refers to “albor” (dawn). This singing has a Castilian origin.

Alboreá is seldom part of flamenco recitals because there is superstition of bad luck should it be sung for anything that is not a gypsy wedding. It is usually sung in gypsy marriage rites and their lyrics are linked to this topic. For gypsy singers, this style should be kept for weddings and not be sung outside of these ceremonies.

Its lyrics should be accompanied by 4 seven-syllable verses and a refrain. It is often sung with a libre (no beat structure) beginning followed by a 12 count measure, which can also sound like an abandolao rhythm in a 6 count measure, similar to bulerías.

Discography

Magna antología del cante flamenco, vol. III, CD Edition, compiled by José Blas Vega, Hispavox, 1992

Sources

https://flamenco.one/en/glossary/alborea/

ÁLVAREZ CABALLERO, Ángel: La discoteca ideal del flamenco, Editorial Planeta, Barcelona, 1995 

Flamenco styles
Spanish music
Andalusian music
Spanish dances
Spanish folk music